Josiane Vanhuysse (born 10 January 1953) is a former Belgian racing cyclist. She won the Belgian national road race title in 1985, as well as a stage in the 1985 Tour de France Féminine.

References

External links

1953 births
Living people
Belgian female cyclists
People from Wervik
Cyclists from West Flanders